Noori Jam Tamachi is a famous tale of Prince Jam Tamachi's falling in love with the charming fisherwoman Noori. Noori makes Jam happy with her perfect surrender and obedience which causes him to raise her above all the other queens.The story also appears in Shah Jo Risalo and forms part of seven popular tragic romances from Sindh, Pakistan. The other six tales are Umar Marvi, Sassui Punnhun, Sohni Mehar, Lilan Chanesar, Sorath Rai Diyach and Momal Rano commonly known as the Seven Queens of Sindh, or the Seven heroines of Shah Abdul Latif Bhittai.

It is the only story of the lot of fulfilled love and happiness and not of burning love and helpless search.

Overview 
Jam Tamachi was a Samma prince, a ruler of Sindh, Thatta, Pakistan. There are three lakes lying between Jherruk and Thatta, called the Keenjhar, the Chholmari and Sonahri. On the banks of Keenjhar, broken walls are still visible that mark the site of an old fishing village. A girl of this class, Noori, attracts the attention of Jam Tamachi, who madly fell in love with her and raised her above the ladies of royal blood. She was also called Gandri, her clean name.

This legend has been retold countless times and is often used as metaphor for divine love by Sufis. Its most beautiful rendering is in found in poetic compendium Shah Jo Risalo of Shah Abdul Latif Bhitai. By this anecdote, Shah shows that humility is great thing and is meant to rise in the favour of the creator.

Noori's grave 

According to the legend, Noori was buried in the middle of Keenjhar Lake, Pakistan. Her last resting place is visited by hundreds of tourists daily.

See also 
 Sur Kamod
 Jam Tamachi
 Samma Dynasty
 Tomb paintings of Sindh

References

External links 
 Nuri Jam Tamachi in English
 Nuri Jam Tamachi in Sindhi
 Sur Kamod in Risalo
  Legend of Nuri Jam Tamachi
 Shah Jo Risalo – The Selection, translated by: Elsa Kazi in English Language

Love stories
Sindhi folklore
Sufi literature
Pakistani folklore
Pakistani literature
Sindhi people
Literary duos
Shah Jo Risalo